Nevena may refer to the following articles

 stefan (album), a 2013 album by M-Flo
 Neven (given name), a Slavic masculine name
 Neven Bell, a character from the Monk TV series
 Hartmut Neven (born 1964), German scientist working in computational neurobiology, robotics and computer vision

See also
 Nevan, an Irish name
 Neven du Mont (disambiguation)
 William James MacNeven (1763–1841), Irish-American physician, chemist, and writer